New Connexions Free Church is a church in the Cambridgeshire city of Ely. Part of the Countess of Huntingdon's Connexion along with over 20 other churches. Congregants meet every Sunday, and hold services and groups for people of all ages. The church is located at Larkfield, High Barns.

History
New Connexions Free Church Ely is the youngest of the churches in the Countess of Huntingdon (a small group founded by Selina Hastings, Countess of Huntingdon). The church is part of the Countess of Huntingdon's Connexion, a small protestant connexion of independent churches.
This new place of worship for Ely was founded as a result of a vision given to an elder from the local Countess Church in Ely. New Connexions could be described as a contemporarily relevant church with a clear biblical basis of faith serving the local community.

The current pastor at New Connexions Free Church is Rev. Keith Waters.

References

Ely, Cambridgeshire
Churches in Cambridgeshire
Countess of Huntingdon's Connexion